Roblin may refer to:

Places
 Dauphin—Roblin, provincial electoral division in Manitoba, Canada
 Municipality of Roblin, a rural municipality in Manitoba Canada
 Roblin, Manitoba, Canada
 Roblin (electoral division), Manitoba, Canada
 Roblin-Russell, former provincial electoral division in Manitoba, Canada
 Roblín, village and municipality in Prague-West District, Czech Republic
 Rural Municipality of Roblin, a former rural municipality in Manitoba, Canada

People
 David Roblin (April 19, 1812–1863), lumber merchant and political figure in Canada West
 Dufferin Roblin (1917–2010), Canadian businessman and politician
 John Philip Roblin (1799–1874), farmer and political figure in Upper Canada and Canada West
 John Roblin (1774–1813), farmer and political figure in Upper Canada
 Rodmond Roblin (1853–1937), businessman and politician in Manitoba, Canada

Other uses
 Roblin Airport, airport in Manitoba
 Roblin Lake Camp, Salvation Army camp located in Ameliasburg, Ontario serving Kingston and the greater Frontenac County area